Nematopogon metaxella is a moth of the Adelidae family. It is found in most of Europe.

The wingspan is 15–17 mm. Head ochreous-orange, face whitish. Forewings shorter and broader, shining ochreous, indistinctly brownish - strigulated ; a brownish discal mark beyond middle. Hindwings fuscous ; cilia light grey, suffused basally with ochreous.  Adults are on wing from June to July.They fly in the afternoon and at dusk. The habitat is alluvial forest  and high moorland forest.

The larvae feed in a case among detritus and leaf-litter on the ground.

References

External links
Bestimmungshilfe für die in Europa nachgewiesenen Schmetterlingsarten
 UKmoths
 Fauna Europaea
 Images representing Nematopogon metaxella at Consortium for the Barcode of Life

Moths described in 1813
Adelidae
Moths of Europe